Guaymaral y Torca is a combined wetland, part of the Wetlands of Bogotá, located in the north of the Colombian capital in the localities Suba and Usaquén, Bogotá, Colombia. Guaymaral y Torca, the northernmost wetlands of Bogotá at the foot of the Eastern Hills, is composed of three parts, Guaymaral in the west in Suba, Torca in the east in Usaquén and a small strip along the dividing Autopista Norte between the two main wetlands. The wetlands are located in the Torca River basin. The Autopista Norte was constructed in 1952, dividing the wetlands.

Etymology 

The word Guaymaral is derived from the Chibcha name for Brosimum utile, guaimaro, cultivated by the indigenous people in the Valle de Upár and the Muzo. Torca is named after the Torca River.

Flora and fauna

Flora 
Flora registered in Guaymaral y Torca are among others Pennisetum clandestinum, Salix humboldtiana, Ulex europaeus, Schonoplectus californicus, Galium ascendens, Bidens laevis, Ludwigia peploides, Azolla filiculoides, Holcus lanatus, Eichhornia crassipe, Typha domingensis, Rumex conglomeratus, Alnus acuminata, Baccharis cf. latifolia, Polygonum sp., Eleocharis sp., Carex sp., Rubus sp., Cuphea sp.. Also Hydrocotyle ranunculoides, Lemna minor, Typha latifolia and Juncus bogotensis have been noted.

Fauna 
Mammals
A mammal present in the wetland is the Bogotá savanna guinea pig species Cavia anolaimae.

Amphibians
Amphibians registered are among others the green dotted treefrog (Hyla labialis) and the cream-backed poison frog (Colostethus subpunctatus).

Birds
In Guaymaral, 43 and in Torca 24 bird species have been registered.

Birds spotted are among others the saffron finch (Sicalis flaveola), yellow-billed cuckoo (Coccyzus americanus), and yellow-hooded blackbird (Chrysomus icterocephalus bogotensis).

See also 

Biodiversity of Colombia, Bogotá savanna, Thomas van der Hammen Natural Reserve
Wetlands of Bogotá

References

Bibliography

Further reading

External links 
  Fundación Humedales de Bogotá
  Conozca los 15 humedales de Bogotá - El Tiempo

Wetlands of Bogotá
Muysccubun